Paşaköy is a village in the Çankırı District of Çankırı Province in Turkey. Its population is 36 (2021).

References

Villages in Çankırı District